Račišće is a village on the island of Korčula, part of the Dubrovnik-Neretva county in Croatia.

Geography
Korčula is an island in the southern half of Dalmatia, Račišće being located at the northern side of the island. The village is situated 12 kilometers west of the old town of Korčula. It is situated on 31 m above sea level.

History
Račišće was established in the second half of the 17th century by refugees from Makarska, fleeing the Ottomans. In  1730 the island and village was settled by refugees from Herzegovina.

Churches
Church of the Mother of God (Bogorodica), or Church of St. Blasius (Sv. Vlaho), with Baroque Loggia, built in 1682
Church of St. Nicholas (Sv. Nikola), built in the 19th century

Demographics
According to the 2001 census it had a population of 477.

References

External links 
 Racisce.info
 www.dzs.hr

Korčula
Populated places in Dubrovnik-Neretva County
Populated coastal places in Croatia